The 2nd Supreme People's Assembly (SPA) in North Korea was elected on 27 August 1957 and convened for its first session on 18–20 September 1957. It was replaced on 23 October 1962 by the 3rd Supreme People's Assembly.

Meetings

Officers

Chairman

Vice Chairman

Deputies

Demographic of deputies

By age

By education

By class

References

Citations

Bibliography
Books:
  
 

2nd Supreme People's Assembly
1957 establishments in North Korea
1962 disestablishments in North Korea